Nauclea diderrichii is a species of tree of the genus Nauclea in the family Rubiaceae.

Description
Nauclea diderrichii is found in Angola, Cameroon, Central African Republic, the Republic of the Congo, the Democratic Republic of the Congo, Ivory Coast, Gabon, Ghana, Liberia, Mozambique, Nigeria, Sierra Leone, and Uganda. Its natural habitat is subtropical or tropical moist lowland forests. It grows to around 35m to 48m tall, and 1m to 2m in diameter at breast height. It is threatened by overexploitation for timber and habitat loss.

Uses
The timber is known as bilinga, or Aloma in Germany and opepe in the UK. It is hard, dense and resistant to fungi and insects, and is used in joinery, flooring and marine construction.

References

External links

 

diderrichii
Near threatened plants
Taxonomy articles created by Polbot
Taxa named by Émile Auguste Joseph De Wildeman